Plus One was an American Christian pop boy band which formed in 1999, disbanded in 2004, and briefly reunited in 2014. The group's line-up consisted of Nate Cole, Jason Perry, Jeremy Mhire, Nathan Walters and Gabe Combs. The group enjoyed their greatest success with the release of their debut album, The Promise (2000). The group then released Obvious (2002). Jason Perry and Jeremy Mhire left the band in 2003, and the remaining three members signed a deal with Inpop Records. A year later they released Exodus; their first album as a trio. After the album's supporting tour, they disbanded in 2004 to pursue other interests. Walters, Combs, and Perry briefly reunited in 2014, releasing "My All".

History

Formation and early years: 1999–2000 

Plus One began to take shape as early as 1999 and formed by a manager named Mitchell Solarek, when 18-year-old Sacramento, California-boy Nate Cole was joined by 21-year-old Gabe Combs of Pittsburg, California, 22-year-old Nathan Walters of Lakeland, Florida and the 19-year-old Jeremy Mhire of Springfield, Missouri, who had been engrossed in vocal studies as a junior on full scholarship to Southwest Missouri State University. Cole and Combs had known each other from mutual music circles while growing up in Northern California and Walters had initially heard about the new group through an acquaintance of Cole's. The group came to complete fruition with the arrival of 17-year old Jason Perry of Madison, Indiana, who up to that moment had been focusing on his role as starting fullback and defensive end for his high school football team. Perry is the youngest member of the group. The name Plus One refers to the members of the group, plus God. Atlantic Records pursued the formation of a boy band motivated by the success of such secular bands as 'N Sync and Backstreet Boys. Auditions were held, and these five young men, who were all raised in the Assembly of God Church, three of them being pastors' sons, came together and melded as a group, all firmly believing that the Lord had brought them together to be in Christian ministry, to do great things for the Gospel. Plus One got together as a quintet.

The Promise and "Remarkable Success": 2000-2001 

Their successful debut album, The Promise, was released in May 2000, and enjoyed great success in the Christian pop scene. The Promise went gold with more than 500,000 album sales. Producer David Foster was one of the producers on Plus One's albums. They had two No. 1 Christian radio hits, "Written on My Heart", which was No. 1 on the charts for two months, and "God Is in This Place" followed by "Last Flight Out", "Here in My Heart", and the other radio singles "Run to You" and "Soul Tattoo". They found themselves touring with such Christian artists as Jaci Velasquez, Rachael Lampa, and Stacie Orrico. In 2000, they appeared in an episode of hit soap opera Days of Our Lives to perform on the show. They performed "Grown-Up Christmas List" with Monica on ABC's Christmas Eve special, "'Twas the Night Before Christmas". In addition, Plus One was featured as one of the new artists of 2000 on TNN's annual television special, "Class of 2000". They gave performances at the 2000 Democratic National Convention, and several major league sporting events including games with the Los Angeles Lakers, Chicago Bulls, and Atlanta Hawks. The band was featured on Teen Magazine Online and performed at Atlanta Fest and the Raggedy Ann Festival in Arcola, IL, as part of their tour schedule. The following year in 2001, they appeared as juvenile kids who form a group while in jail on the TV series Touched by an Angel and they were nominated for a Dove Award as New Artist of the Year. The group recorded a soundtrack called "With All Your Heart" and it was included on the soundtrack of the Warner Brothers film, Pokémon: The Movie 2000 followed by "I Need a Miracle" from the Christian Bible-based film Left Behind: The Movie released in 2000. They also appear on Natalie Grant's album Stronger with the song "Whenever You Need Somebody" in 2001. They also covered the American patriotic song "America the Beautiful" and they performed in Luis Palau Festival in 2001.

Obvious and Christmas: 2001-2002 

Returning from the Promise tour, Plus One went back into the studio to record songs for a new album, this time including some of their own material, tracks like "Use Me", a ballad called "You", "Under the Influence", "Kick Me", and "Going Crazy". A strong beat and guitar riffs defined these new tracks, distinguishing them from the lighter sound of the group's first recording. Obvious was released in February 2002, and sold twice as many copies in its first week of release as Promise had. It hit the number-one spot on the Christian charts immediately. Three of the album's tracks, "Camouflage", "I Don't Care" and "Let Me Be the One", became hit singles on the top-ten Christian radio charts. In the fall of 2002 during their Obvious Tour, Plus One released Christmas, a collection of Christmas music. In addition their own renditions of "Silent Night", "O Little Town of Bethlehem", "What Child Is This?", "O Holy Night", "It's The Most Wonderful Time of the Year" and other Christmas standards, the album included some original compositions as well, including the opening track, "This Is Christmas", and "I Won't Forget This Christmas" and a song titled "Our Christmas Prayer" and "A Prayer for Every Year" which was released on WOW Christmas: Red in 2002.

Departure of Perry and Mhire, and Exodus: 2002-2003 

In 2002, after completing touring for their Obvious tour and promoting their Christmas album, two members of Plus One were called to other ministries and obligations, Jason Perry left the group in 2003 followed by Jeremy Mhire leaving the remaining three members to carry on Plus One's music ministry. In 2003, the band was dropped from their label. Seeking to revamp their image, they signed a deal with Inpop Records and released their third album, the first time releasing an album without their two former members. Exodus. As a result, the band became a trio. Co-produced by former Newsboys frontman Peter Furler and keyboardist Jeff Frankenstein, Exodus marked a departure from the boy band image, leaving the all-out "pop" style for a more mature sound featuring keyboards, guitars and the band performing their own materials. Peter Furler said that "it's some of the best music I've ever been part of" and that he can feel justifiably proud of turning out this album. "Be Love" is the hit single on this album, and was followed by "Circle". The album contains all original songs, with the exception of a rendition of the Tim Hughes hit "Here I Am to Worship".

Break-up and Hiatus: 2004-2016 

In 2004, after completing the Exodus 04 tour, Plus One quietly parted ways with Inpop and with each other. On September 23, 2004, Nate Cole announced that Plus One would most likely be breaking up. Nate Cole and Gabe Combs went on to form Indie rock band Castledoor with their wives Liska Cole and Coury Combs and released 5 EP's and one album. In 2008, Nathan Walters went on to pursue a solo career, releasing one album called Escape in Nashville, TN. After Castledoor, Nate Cole and his wife Liska Cole started a duo band called Doom & Gloom and released home recordings. In 2011 Gabe Combs and Nathan Walters started a music production called Multitone Musik to merge their production and songwriting skills.  In December 2016, Nate Cole released his first solo album Bad Beat.

Reunion: 2014 

On April 14, 2014, Plus One announced that they had reunited with three original members: Nathan Walters, Gabe Combs, and Jason Perry, who previously had quit the group in 2003. They also announced the release of their latest single, "My All", available on their official website and their Facebook page.

Members 

 Nate Cole (1999–2004) – vocals
 Jason Perry (1999–2003, 2014) – vocals
 Jeremy Mhire (1999–2003) – vocals
 Nathan Walters (1999–2004, 2014) – vocals, keyboards
 Gabe Combs (1999–2004, 2014) – vocals, guitars

Discography

Compilation contributions

Singles

As a featured artist

On television

Videography

References 

Atlantic Records artists
American Christian musical groups
American boy bands
Vocal quintets
Performers of contemporary Christian music
Musical groups established in 1999
Musical groups disestablished in 2004
Musical groups from Tennessee
Inpop Records artists
Musical groups reestablished in 2014
1999 establishments in Tennessee